The Middle Sepik languages comprise diverse groups of Sepik languages spoken in northern Papua New Guinea. The Middle Sepik grouping is provisionally accepted by Foley (2018) based on shared innovations in pronouns, but is divided by Glottolog. They are spoken in areas surrounding the town of Ambunti in East Sepik Province.

Unlike most other Sepik languages, Middle Sepik languages do not overtly mark gender on nouns, although the third-person singular pronoun does distinguish between masculine and feminine genders (e.g., Proto-Ndu *nd- ‘3sg.m’ and *l- ‘3sg.f’).

Languages
The languages are:

Ma–Tama
Nukuma languages (see)
Tama languages (see)
Ndu–Yerekai
Ndu–Nggala
Nggala
Ndu languages (see)
Yerakai (Garamambu)

References

 

 
Sepik languages